Il bravo, ossia La Veneziana ("The Assassin, or The Venetian Woman") is an opera in three acts by Saverio Mercadante to an Italian-language libretto by Gaetano Rossi and Marco Marcello. Their libretto was based on the play La Vénétienne by Auguste Anicet-Bourgeois, which was in turn based on James Fenimore Cooper's novel The Bravo. The opera premiered on 9 March 1839 at La Scala, Milan and subsequently played throughout Italy and abroad. The opera was still being occasionally performed and recorded in the 20th century. and was hailed as an "exciting rediscovery" when it was staged by the Wexford Festival in 2018.

Roles

Summary
In order to save his father's life, Carlo has accepted to become a henchman and to serve the government of Venice. When ordered to murder Theodora, he finds that the latter is his former wife : he tried to kill her because he thought (mistakenly) she had betrayed him. Foscari, a patrician, was in love with Theodora, and now loves her daughter, Violetta, but the latter is in love with Pisani, an exiled patrician. The lovers manage to escape, while Theodora kills herself in the hope of saving Carlo's father's life. Carlo, however, discovers that his father is already dead.

Recordings
1976: Orchestra and Chorus of the Teatro dell'Opera di Roma,  (conductor); William Johns (Il bravo), Miwako Matsumoto (Violetta), Maria Parazzini (Teodora), Paolo Washington (Foscari), Antonio Savastano (Pisani), Gino Sinimberghi (Cappello), Loris Gambelli (Marco), Mario Macchi (Luigi), Giovanna di Rocco (Michelina). Recorded live. Label: Warner Fonit
1990: Orchestra Internazionale d'Italia, Slovak Philharmonic Chorus,  (conductor); Dino Di Domenico (Il bravo), Janet Perry (Violetta), Adelisa Tabiadon (Teodora), Stefano Antonucci (Foscari), Sergio Bertocchi (Pisani), Leonardo De Lisi (Cappello), Ambrogio Riva (Marco), Giuseppe De Matteis (Luigi), Maria Cristina Zanni (Michelina). Recorded live. Label: Nuova Era

References

External links

Rossi, Gaetano (1865). Il bravo: melodramma in tre atti. Ricordi

Operas by Saverio Mercadante
Italian-language operas
1839 operas
Operas
Opera world premieres at La Scala
Operas based on plays
Operas based on novels
Operas set in Venice
Libretti by Gaetano Rossi